Riverview High School is one of two alternative high schools operated by Mesa Public Schools. It was formerly known as Mesa Vista High School.

External links

Public high schools in Arizona
High schools in Mesa, Arizona